Neural Network Quantum States (NQS or NNQS) is a general class of variational quantum states parameterized in terms of an artificial neural network. It was first introduced in 2017 by the physicists Giuseppe Carleo and Matthias Troyer to approximate wave functions of many-body quantum systems.

Given a many-body quantum state  comprising  degrees of freedom and a choice of associated quantum numbers , then an NQS parameterizes the wave-function amplitudes

where  is an artificial neural network of parameters (weights) ,  input variables and one complex-valued output corresponding to the wave-function amplitude.

This variational form is used in conjunction with specific stochastic learning approaches to approximate quantum states of interest.

Learning the Ground-State Wave Function 
One common application of NQS is to find an approximate representation of the ground state wave function of a given Hamiltonian . The learning procedure in this case consists in finding the best neural-network weights that minimize the variational energy

 
Then it can be shown that the sample mean of the so-called "local energy"  is a statistical estimate of the quantum expectation value , i.e.

Similarly, it can be shown that the gradient of the energy with respect to the network weights  is also approximated by a sample mean

where  and can be efficiently computed, in deep networks through backpropagation.

The stochastic approximation of the gradients is then used to minimize the energy  typically using a stochastic gradient descent approach. When the neural-network parameters are updated at each step of the learning procedure, a new set of samples  is generated, in an iterative procedure similar to what done in unsupervised learning.

Connection with Tensor Networks 
Neural-Network representations of quantum wave functions share some similarities with variational quantum states based on tensor networks. For example, connections with matrix product states have been established. These studies have shown that NQS support volume law scaling for the entropy of entanglement.

See also 
 Differentiable programming

References 

Quantum mechanics
Quantum Monte Carlo
Machine learning